Tetín may refer to several places in the Czech Republic:

Tetín (Beroun District), Beroun District
Tetín (Jičín District), Jičín District